For Latvia's Development (abbr. LA) is a liberal political party in Latvia. It is positioned on the centre-right on the political spectrum.

History 
The party was founded in 2013 by the former Prime Minister of Latvia Einars Repše.

Internationally the party is a full member of the Alliance of Liberals and Democrats for Europe Party, a grouping of centrist and liberal parties from across Europe, since April 2013.

On 29 November 2014 Juris Pūce was elected as the new chairperson and a new political manifesto was adopted.

With the adoption of the new manifesto, the party defined itself as a liberal party that "appreciates and values" individual freedom and equal treatment before the law regardless of nationality, race, sex, sexual orientation, religion, or physical and mental abilities.

Ahead of the 2018 parliamentary election, LA formed an alliance with Movement For! and Growth, called "Development/For!". This alliance, led by Artis Pabriks, won 12% of the votes and 13 of 100 seats in the Saeima. It joined the Kariņš cabinet, taking three ministerial posts, including Juris Pūce as minister of environmental protection and regional development as well as Artis Pabriks as defence minister and deputy prime minister. Artis Pabriks and member of the European Parliament Ivars Ijabs, who had been members of the "Development/For!" alliance, but not For Latvia's Development, joined the party in October 2019.

Election results

Legislative elections

European Parliament elections

Riga City Council

2 In an electoral alliance with Latvian Association of Regions.

Cohabitation Law initiative
On 23 March 2015 party leader Juris Pūce launched a signature collection campaign on ManaBalss.lv for the adoption of a Cohabitation Law in Latvia that received more than 10,000 signatures, but was rejected by the Saeima on 15 March 2018.

Symbols and logos

References

External links
Official website 

Political parties in Latvia
Liberal parties in Latvia
Classical liberal parties
Political parties established in 2013
Alliance of Liberals and Democrats for Europe Party member parties